An IP PBX ("Internet Protocol private branch exchange") is a system that connects telephone extensions to the public switched telephone network (PSTN) and provides internal communication for a business. An IP PBX is a PBX system with IP connectivity and may provide additional audio, video, or instant messaging communication utilizing the TCP/IP protocol stack.

Voice over IP (VoIP) gateways can be combined with traditional PBX functionality to allow businesses to use their managed intranet to help reduce long distance expenses and take advantage of the benefits of a single network for voice and data (converged network). An IP PBX may also provide CTI features.

An IP PBX can exist as a physical hardware device or as a software platform.

Function
IP PBX is primarily a software hosted on a regular desktop or server as per the requirement demands based on the expected traffic & criticality. Till 2019 IP PBX were deployed primarily as inbound and outbound call center solutions for large corporate and commercial cloud telephony operators worldwide cloud communications. Most of the IP PBX installation uses Asterisk (PBX) for its telephony support, built on LAMP (Linux-Apache-MySQL-PHP). With telecom service providers across the world is slowly preferring SIP Trunks over Primary Rate Interface as main enterprise communication delivery, the IP PBXs will now be in demand extensively. As IP PBX is software, functions and features can be designed based on the customers' requirements such as conference calling, XML-RPC control of live calls, interactive voice response (IVR), TTS/ASR (text to speech/automatic speech recognition), PSTN interconnectability supporting both analog and digital circuits, VoIP protocols including SIP, Inter-Asterisk eXchange, H.323, Jingle and others.

IP PBX software
 3CX Phone System - Was based on Windows operating system, but now has windows and linux versions.
 Asterisk - Based on Linux operating system and has the largest market share.

Most of the other IP PBXs were derived and customised on Asterisk as you will find a very long list.

 Bicom Systems
 Dialexia
 MVoice
 trixbox (formerly Asterisk@Home)
freeswitch https://freeswitch.com/ 
xivo https://www.xivo.solutions/

See also
 Cloud communications

References

Office equipment
Telecommunications equipment
VoIP software